The 2022 CONCACAF W Championship was the 11th edition of the CONCACAF W Championship, the quadrennial international women's football championship contested by the senior women's national teams of the member associations of CONCACAF, the regional governing body of North America, Central America, and the Caribbean. Eight teams played in the tournament, which took place from 4 to 18 July 2022 in Mexico. The United States emerged as the winner, defeating Canada 1–0 in the final.

The tournament served as the CONCACAF qualifiers to the 2023 FIFA Women's World Cup in Australia and New Zealand, as well as for the football tournament at the 2024 Summer Olympics in France. The top two teams in each of the two groups qualified for the World Cup, while the third-placed teams from each group advanced to the inter-confederation play-offs. In addition, the winner qualified for the 2024 Olympics and the 2024 CONCACAF W Gold Cup, while the second and third-placed teams advanced to the CONCACAF Olympic play-off.

The United States were the two-time defending champions, having won the 2014 and 2018 tournaments.

Qualification

The qualifying competition was held in February and April 2022. For six of the available eight slots, thirty teams were drawn into six groups of five, and played two home and two away matches in a single round-robin format. The six group winners advanced to the CONCACAF W final tournament. In addition, Canada and the United States, the two highest-ranked CONCACAF teams in the FIFA Women's World Rankings of August 2020, qualified automatically.

Qualified teams
The following teams qualified for the CONCACAF W final tournament.

Venues
On 14 February 2022, CONCACAF announced the tournament would be hosted in Mexico, with all matches scheduled to be played in the Monterrey metropolitan area.

Format
Eight teams played in the tournament, drawn into two groups of four teams and played single round-robin matches. The top two teams of each group advanced to the knockout stage, and qualified for the 2023 FIFA Women's World Cup. The two third-placed teams from the group stage advanced to the inter-confederation play-offs. The number of slots is an expansion from the previous Women's World Cup qualifying competition, which allocated only 3.5 spots to CONCACAF.

The knockout stage featured the semi-finals, a third place match, and the final to determine the champions. The winners of the competition qualified for the football tournament at the 2024 Summer Olympics in France, while the second and third-placed teams advanced to the CONCACAF Olympic play-off.

Tiebreakers
Teams were ranked according to points (3 points for a win, 1 point for a draw, 0 points for a loss). The rankings of teams in each group were determined as follows (regulations Articles 12.3):

If two or more teams are equal on the basis of the above three criteria, their rankings are determined as follows:

Draw
 
The group stage draw was held on 19 April 2022, 19:00 EDT (UTC−4), in Miami. The eight teams were split into four pots of two teams each, based on the FIFA Women's World Rankings of June 2021. The highest-ranked nation, the United States, was automatically placed in position 1 of Group A, while the second highest-ranked nation, Canada, was placed in position 1 of Group B. The remaining teams were drawn into Group A and B in order, taking the position corresponding to their pot.

Squads

Each national team had to submit a preliminary list of up to 60 players, 5 of whom must be goalkeepers, at least thirty days before the opening match of the tournament. Using players only from this list, each team must submit a final squad of 23 players, 3 of whom must be goalkeepers, at least ten days before the opening match of the tournament. If a player became injured or ill severely enough to prevent their participation in the tournament before their team's first match, or following the completion of the group stage, they could be replaced by another player from the preliminary list.

Match officials
On 21 June 2022, CONCACAF announced the list of match officials for the tournament.

Referees

  Marie-Soleil Beaudoin
  Myriam Marcotte
  Marianela Araya
  Astrid Gramajo
  Melissa Borjas
  Odette Hamilton
  Katia García
  Francia González
  Tatiana Guzmán
  Ekaterina Koroleva
  Tori Penso

Assistant referees

  Chantal Boudreau
  Ivett Santiago
  Lidia Ayala
  Iris Vail
  Lourdes Noriega
  Shirley Perelló
  Jassett Kerr
  Stephanie-Dale Yee Sing
  Enedina Caudillo
  Mayte Chávez
  Karen Díaz
  Sandra Ramírez
  Mijensa Rensch
  Felisha Mariscal
  Brooke Mayo
  Kathryn Nesbitt

Video assistant referees

  Chantal Boudreau
  Carol Anne Chenard
  Marianela Araya
  Melissa Borjas
  Shirley Perelló
  Odette Hamilton
  Stephanie-Dale Yee Sing
  Enedina Caudillo
  Mayte Chávez
  Karen Díaz
  Francia González
  Sandra Ramírez
  Tatiana Guzmán
  Ekaterina Koroleva
  Felisha Mariscal
  Brooke Mayo
  Kathryn Nesbitt
  Tori Penso

Group stage
The tournament schedule, without kick-off times, was announced on 20 April 2022, the day following the draw.

The top two teams of each group qualified for the 2023 FIFA Women's World Cup in Australia and New Zealand. The third-placed teams in each group advanced to the inter-confederation play-offs.

All times are local, CDT (UTC−5).

Group A

Group B

Knockout stage

In the knockout stage, if a match was level at the end of normal playing time, extra time (two periods of 15 minutes each) was played and followed, if necessary, by a penalty shoot-out to determine the winners.

Bracket

Semi-finals

Third place match
The winner advanced to the CONCACAF Olympic play-in.

Final

The winner qualified for the football tournament at the 2024 Summer Olympics in France and the 2024 CONCACAF W Gold Cup. The runners-up advanced to the CONCACAF Olympic play-in.

Goalscorers

Awards

Qualification for international tournaments

Qualified teams for FIFA Women's World Cup
The following six teams from CONCACAF qualified for the 2023 FIFA Women's World Cup.

1 Bold indicates champions for that year. Italic indicates hosts for that year.

Qualified teams for Summer Olympics and CONCACAF W Gold Cup
The following two teams from CONCACAF will qualify for the 2024 Summer Olympic women's football tournament and the 2024 CONCACAF W Gold Cup. In addition to the winner of the W Championship (United States), the winner of a CONCACAF Olympic play-in between the second and third-placed teams of the W Championship will also qualify.

2 Bold indicates champions for that year. Italic indicates hosts for that year.

Marketing

Logo
The official logo was unveiled on 19 August 2021.

Official song
"Lions (Champions Mix)" by Jamaican singer Skip Marley (feat. Cedella Marley) served as the official song of the tournament.

Broadcasting rights

CONCACAF

International

Notes

References

External links

 
2022
2021–22 in CONCACAF football
2023 FIFA Women's World Cup qualification
2022
2021–22 in Mexican football
2022 in women's association football
July 2022 sports events in Mexico
21st century in Monterrey
Football in Monterrey
Football at the 2024 Summer Olympics – Women's qualification